|}

The Mandarin Handicap Chase is a National Hunt handicap steeplechase in England which is open to horses aged four years or older. 
It is run at Newbury over a distance of about 3 miles and 2 furlongs (3 miles 2 furlongs and 214 yards, or 5,426 metres), and it is scheduled to take place each year at the end of December.

The race was first run in 1963 and two of the first three runnings were won by Mill House, carrying high weights.
In the 1980s it held Listed status, but it is now an ordinary handicap.

Winners

See also
 Horse racing in Great Britain
 List of British National Hunt races

References
Racing Post:

National Hunt races in Great Britain
National Hunt chases
Newbury Racecourse
Recurring sporting events established in 1963
1963 establishments in England